1. Fußball-Club Köln 01/07 e. V. II, commonly known as simply 1. FC Köln II, is a German football team based in Cologne. It is the reserve team of German association football club 1. FC Köln.

The team has qualified for the first round of the DFB-Pokal, the German Cup, seven times and managed to reach the second round, three times. The team currently plays in the fourth tier of German Football, the Regionalliga West.

History
Their biggest ever win was in May 2013 when they defeated MSV Duisburg II 9-0. In the 2001–02 season, the managed to win the Oberliga Nordrhein and was promoted to the Regionalliga Nord, but was then relegated back to it in the 2007–08 season. They joined the Regionalliga West in 2008 when the Oberliga Nordrhein became defunct and finished 8th in their first season.

They have played in the DFB-Pokal 10 times. The first ever time was in the 1976–77 season when they were knocked out in the first round by Hamburger SV. The most recent time playing in the cup was in the 2005–06 season when they were knocked out by Hannover 96 in the first round, in a 0-4 home loss.

Honours 
 German amateur football championship
 Winners: 1981
Oberliga Nordrhein
 Champions: 1981, 2002
 Verbandsliga Mittelrhein
 Champions: 1965, 1967, 1977
 Middle Rhine Cup
 Winners: 1995, 2004, 2005

Stadium
The Franz-Kremer-Stadion is the home of 1. FC Köln II. It was named after legendary chairman Franz Kremer.

Current squad

Past Managers
 Hans-Dieter Roos (1972–1975)
 Erich Rutemöller (1980–1985)
 Roland Koch (1987–1989)
 Bernd Krauss (1990)
 Eberhard Vogel (1991-1992)
 Stephan Engels (1994-1995)
 Mathias Hönerbach (1995-1996)
 Christoph John (1998-2007)
 Frank Schaefer (2007-2010)
 Thomas Rainer (2010-2011)
 Dirk Lottner (2011-2012)
 Thomas Rainer (2012)
 Dirk Lottner (2012-2014)
 Stephan Engels (2014-)

References

External links
 Official website 
 1. FC Köln II at Weltfussball.de 

German reserve football teams
North Rhine-Westphalia reserve football teams
1. FC Köln